Transmembrane serine protease 11F is a protein that in humans is encoded by the TMPRSS11F gene.

References

Further reading